Ratsey may refer to:

George Ernest Ratsey (1875–1942), British sailor who competed in the 1908 Summer Olympics
George Colin Ratsey (1906–1984), British sailor and sail maker
Ratsey & Lapthorn, sail maker